Tandil Airport, is an airport serving the city of Tandil, in the Buenos Aires Province of Argentina.

Most flights are for military training.

Runway length does not include  asphalt overruns on each end of the runway. The Tandil VOR-DME (Ident: DIL) and non-directional beacon (Ident: D) are located on the field.

See also

Transport in Argentina
List of airports in Argentina

References

External links 
OpenStreetMap - Heroes De Malvinas Airport
FallingRain - Tandil Airport

Airports in Argentina
Buenos Aires Province